The 12559/60 Shiv Ganga Express is a daily superfast train of the North Eastern Railway Zone, that runs between  and , named after the two jewels of Varanasi: Shiva and the Ganges river. The two main cities along the route are Prayagraj and Kanpur.

Gallery

Time table

From Banaras to New Delhi it starts with Number 12559 and time table is as:

From New Delhi to Banaras it starts with Number 12560 and time table is as:

Reservation
People have to take an advanced reservation ticket to travel in the train except for the General class.
It records a rush of passengers throughout the year in both peak as well as non-peak period.
Because of its comfortable time of arrival and departure, it is fairly popular among masses.

Coach composition

This train has 22 coaches between Banaras Station to New Delhi station.

1 AC 1 Tier Coach (H1)
2 AC 2 Tier Coach (A1-A2)
9 AC 3 Tier Coach (B1-B9)
5 Sleeper class Coach (S1-S5)
3 General compartments (unreserved)
1 SLR
1 EOG

Coach composition for 12559 BSBS-NDLS Shiv Ganga Express:

Coach composition for 12560 NDLS-BSBS Shiv Ganga Express:

Journey

See also
 Patna Express
 Neelachal Express
 Kanpur Shatabdi
 Gyan Ganga SF Express
 Banaras–New Delhi Superfast Express

References

Named passenger trains of India
Passenger trains originating from Varanasi
Transport in Delhi
Express trains in India
Rail transport in Delhi
Railway services introduced in 2002